The Women's sprint competition of the Beijing 2022 Olympics was held on 11 February, at the National Biathlon Centre, in the Zhangjiakou cluster of competition venues,  north of Beijing, at an elevation of . The event was won by Marte Olsbu Røiseland of Norway, who was the 2018 silver medalist in sprint. This was her first individual Olympic gold medal. Elvira Öberg of Sweden won silver, her first Olympic medal, and Dorothea Wierer of Italy bronze, her first individual Olympic medal.

Summary
The 2018 champion, Laura Dahlmeier, and the bronze medalist, Veronika Vítková, retired from competitions. Røiseland was the overall leader of the 2021–22 Biathlon World Cup as well as the leader in the sprint before the Olympics.

Qualification

Results
The race was started at 17:00.

References

Biathlon at the 2022 Winter Olympics
Women's biathlon at the 2022 Winter Olympics